The New Zealand Youth Parliament, held once in each term of parliament (usually every three or four years), is an event used to promote the civic and community engagement of New Zealand youth. The event has been held since 1994, and takes place at the New Zealand Parliament Buildings. The latest Youth Parliament, the 9th Youth Parliament, took place on 16 and 17 July 2019.

Youth Parliament is an initiative led by the Minister for Youth, currently the Hon. Priyanca Radhakrishnan. The Minister works with a committee of their Parliamentary colleagues (representing every party in Parliament) to administer Youth Parliament.

The Minister receives support from the Ministry of Youth Development, who work closely with other agencies within the parliamentary complex including The Office of the Speaker, Parliamentary Services and the Office of the Clerk of the New Zealand House of Representatives.

Former Labour MP Darren Hughes, who once held the Statistics portfolio and was the associate minister for Social Development and Employment, was a Youth MP at the first ever Youth Parliament in 1994. Hughes said in his maiden speech as MP that he was proud to be the first ever Youth MP to become the "real thing".

History 
The New Zealand Youth Parliament was first held in 1994, being held to mark the 20th anniversary of the voting age being lowered to 18. The event was shorter than it is now, with young people coming to Parliament for an educational day. Due to the success of the event, Cabinet invited the Minister of Youth Affairs to continue holding the event every three or four years. Since then, the event has been held in 2019, 2016, 2013, 2010, 2007, 2004, 2000, and 1997.

Event 
The Youth Parliament takes place over two days, and is designed to be as similar to the actual running of Parliament as possible. The event is typically opened by the governor-general. The website of the Ministry of Youth Development says that Youth Parliament "is an opportunity for young New Zealanders to influence government decision-making as active citizens and have their views heard by key decision-makers and the public."

Throughout the event Youth MPs take part in a variety of parliamentary activities. A mock bill is established and focused on, usually targeting an issue relating to youth or that youth can be involved in. Youth MPs work on various select committees and consider submissions, ask questions of Cabinet Ministers, participate in debates, come together in caucus sessions and experience various other aspects of parliament. Youth MPs have an opportunity to meet actual members of parliament. Members of the public can also watch mock debates in the debating chamber, as they would with a normal parliamentary debate.

As well as the Youth MPs, 20 youth press gallery members are chosen by the Parliamentary Press Gallery, and report on the event and running of parliament, similar to the actual press gallery.

The New Zealand Business and Parliament Trust runs a competition open to all Youth MPs and Youth Press Gallery members, which asks entrants to discuss the experience and what they have learned and taken back to their community. In 2007 this was an essay, and in 2010 entrants created a video. Prizes totaling several thousands of dollars are available to the winners.

Select Committees 
During the event Youth MPs work on Parliamentary Select Committees. Each committee views and discusses submissions, and reviews related legislation. Each committee relates to a different subject. As of 2013, there were 10 Youth Parliament Select Committees. These are:
 Social Services
 Health
 Transport and Industrial Relations
 Local Government and Environment
 Education and Science
 Commerce
 Foreign Affairs, Defence and Trade
 Justice
 Maori Affairs
 Primary Production

Selection and role

Young people, aged 16 to 18 years, from around New Zealand are chosen by their local (electorate or list) Member of Parliament (MP) to be a Youth Member of Parliament (Youth MP). There is no set process for an MP to select their Youth MP. During Youth Parliament, Youth MPs have the opportunity to debate legislation, sit on select committees and ask parliamentary questions of Cabinet Ministers. Youth MPs are independent, as opposed to belonging to a Parliamentary party.

Around the Youth Parliament event, Youth MPs remain in the role for a period of time, and are expected to gain an understanding of the ideas and concerns of youth in the area. In 2013 this was from 1 May to 1 December, with the event being held in July, and during this time period the Youth MPs had the opportunity to work with their local communities and local MP.

Organisation

The organisation of Youth Parliament is overseen by the Multi-Party Parliamentary Steering Committee. A representative from each party represented in Parliament is invited to join the committee. The aim is to ensure non-partisan organisation of Youth Parliament as well as active participation by all parties, to ensure that the event is successful. The Ministry of Youth Development also works on organising and promoting the event., with the Minister of Youth Development being responsible for the event overall.

10th Youth Parliament (2022) 
The 10th Youth Parliament was held on 19 and 20 July 2022.

Youth MPs 2022 
List means the individual is representing a List MP, while Electorate indicates they are representing an Electorate MP.

9th Youth Parliament (2019) 
The 9th Youth Parliament was held on 16 and 17 July 2019. The mock bill was the Sustainable Energy Bill, which debated introducing strong targets to move New Zealand to renewable energy alternatives and lower emissions.

This term of Youth Parliament made headlines on multiple occasions. Most notably, a successful motion to declare a climate emergency was moved by Chlöe Swarbrick's Youth MP, Luke Wijohn. Swarbrick herself had unsuccessfully attempted to move the same motion in Parliament weeks earlier.

Youth MP, Shaneel Shavneel Lal founded the movement to end conversion therapy in New Zealand at 9th Youth Parliament after their speech during the general debate. Their speech received a standing ovation at Parliament.

The event also made headlines after it was revealed that Deputy Speaker Anne Tolley had reduced Youth MP Lily Dorrance to tears after shutting down her speech on youth suicide as Dorrance was reading from her notes, which Tolley believed was against standing orders. Multiple Youth MPs raised points of order stating that this was not against standing orders as they believed there was no such rule. Dorrance later said she felt "humiliated", and Tolley subsequently apologised to both Dorrance and Speaker Trevor Mallard.

Later in 2019 but still during the tenureship of the Youth MP programme, three Youth MPs, Wijohn, Arie Faber and Lily Chen, representing Swarbrick, Jan Logie and Golriz Ghahraman respectively, were ejected from Parliament's public gallery and issued with a twelve-month ban from Parliament grounds after interrupting the proceedings of the house by loudly verbally protesting the government's position on the occupation at Ihumātao. Swarbrick, Logie and Ghahraman later stated they disapproved of their Youth MPs actions.

Youth MPs 2019 
List means the individual is representing a List MP, while Electorate indicates they are representing an Electorate MP.

8th Youth Parliament (2016)

Youth MPs 2016 
List means the individual is representing a List MP, while Electorate indicates they are representing an Electorate MP.

7th Youth Parliament (2013) 
The 7th Youth Parliament was held on 16 and 17 July 2013. The mock bill topic was Electoral Reform, with discussions about reducing the voting age, introducing electronic voting, making voting compulsory and extending the Term of Parliament taking place.

Youth MPs 2013 
List means the individual is representing a List MP, while Electorate indicates they are representing an Electorate MP.

6th Youth Parliament (2010) 
The 6th Youth Parliament took place on 6 and 7 July 2010. The mock bill focused on creating a single age of majority, that would make a single age for different activities to become lawful, such as drinking, driving and voting ages.

Youth MPs 2010 
List means the individual is representing a List MP, while Electorate indicates they are representing an Electorate MP.

5th Youth Parliament (2007)
The 5th Youth Parliament took place from 8 to 11 July 2007. This was an extended period of days compared to previous years, as a trial to fit in more events and discussion. After 2007 Youth Parliament reverted to a two-day event.

Youth MPs 2007 
List means the individual is representing a List MP, while Electorate indicates they are representing an Electorate MP.

4th Youth Parliament (2004)
The 4th Youth Parliament took place on 16 and 17 August 2004.

Youth MPs 2004 
List means the individual is representing a List MP, while Electorate indicates they are representing an Electorate MP.

3rd Youth Parliament (2000)

Youth MPs 2000 
List means the individual is representing a List MP, while Electorate indicates they are representing an Electorate MP.

2nd Youth Parliament (1997)

Youth MPs 1997 
List means the individual is representing a List MP, while Electorate indicates they are representing an Electorate MP.

1st Youth Parliament (1994)

Youth MPs 1994

References

External links
Youth Parliament 2016 – MYD – Youth Parliament Website

Parliament of New Zealand
New Zealand Youth Parliament